Graham Stanford (born 25 April 1948) is an Australian cricketer. He played in one first-class match for South Australia in 1968/69.

See also
 List of South Australian representative cricketers

References

External links
 

1948 births
Living people
Australian cricketers
South Australia cricketers
Cricketers from Adelaide